Eman Ghoneim is an Egyptian/American geomorphologist. In March 2006, Dr. Ghoneim, together with Farouk El-Baz, discovered the Kebira Crater, a possible impact crater (astrobleme) in the Sahara. In 2007, while processing microwave space data (radar imagery), she discovered an ancient Mega-Lake (30,750 km2) buried beneath the sand of the Great Sahara in Northern Darfur, Sudan.

Career and research
Eman Ghoneim graduated with an honor degree and received her master's degree from the Geography Department at Tanta University, Egypt in 1997. She was awarded her Ph.D. degree in geography from the Geography Department at the University of Southampton, UK in 2002. In 2003, she held a postdoctoral position at the center for Remote Sensing, Boston University, United States. It was during this time that she helped discover the Kebira Crater. In 2010, she joined the Department of Earth and Ocean Sciences at the University of North Carolina Wilmington (UNCW) and became the director of the Space and Drone Remote Sensing Lab (SDRS).

She has a primary focus on the application of geographic information system (GIS), remote sensing (including multispectral, thermal and microwave radar imagery), unmanned aerial vehicle (UAV) and the use of hydrologic modeling in flash flood hazard, sea level rise, drought and groundwater exploration in arid and coastal environments.
Ghoneim is an expert in image processing and uses a wide array of satellite/space data including multi-spectral, hyper-spectral, thermal infrared (TIR), microwave (radar images) and digital elevation model (DEM). Ghoneim has published more than 27 peer-reviewed papers. She has published more than 48 conference articles and delivered a number of workshops, seminar lectures and training courses for multidisciplinary delegates.

Ghomein was invited as an expert in her field, along with 30 other Egyptian expatriate women, to participate in the Taa Marbouta conference in 2017. The conference, which focused on the importance of Egyptian women in social, political and economic fields, was organised by the Ministry of Immigration and Egyptian Expatriates’ Affairs and the National Council for Women.

In addition to her research work, Ghoneim has been teaching in higher education since 1990. In recognition of her teaching work, she has been awarded multiple prizes, including the Board of Trustees Teaching Excellence Award at the University of North Carolina Wilmington in 2018.

Awards and honours 

 UNC Board of Governors for Excellence in Teaching Award (2021)
 Board of Trustees Teaching Excellence Award, University of North Carolina Wilmington (2018)
 Distinguished Teaching Professorship Award, University of North Carolina Wilmington
 Chancellor's Teaching Excellence Award, University of North Carolina Wilmington (2017) 
‘Egyptian Women Can’ Award (2017)
 Women Leaders in STEM
Best Letter Award by the Remote Sensing and Photogrammetry Society of the United Kingdom for the paper “Largest crater shape in the Great Sahara revealed by multi-spectral images and radar data” (2007)

Selected publications 

 Fahil, A.S, Ghoneim, E., Noweir, M.A., Masoud, A. 2020. Integration of Well Logging and Remote Sensing Data for Detecting Potential Geothermal Sites along the Gulf of Suez, Egypt. Resources 9, 109
 Ghoneim, E., El-Baz, F., 2020. Satellite image data integration for groundwater exploration in Egypt. In: Elbeih S., Negm A., Kostianoy A (edit), Egypt Environment: a Satellite Remote Sensing Approach. Springer. Chapter 8. 211–230.
 Bratley, K., Ghoneim, E. 2018. Modeling Urban Encroachment on the Agricultural Land of the Eastern Nile Delta Using Remote Sensing and GIS-based Markov Chain Model. Land 7(4), 114.
 Mashaly, J., Ghoneim, E. 2018. Flash Flood Hazard Using Optical, Radar, and Stereo-Pair Derived DEM: Eastern Desert, Egypt. Remote Sensing. 10(8), 1204. (Special Issue)
 Ghoneim, E. 2018. Rimaal: A Sand Buried Structure of Possible Impact Origin in the Sahara: Optical and Radar Remote Sensing Investigation. Remote Sensing 10 (6), 880.
 Abrams, W., Ghoneim, E., Shew, R., LaMaskin, T., Al Bloushi, K., Hussein, S., AbuBakr, M., Almulla, A., Al-Awar, M., El-Baz, F. 2018. Delineation of Groundwater Potential in the northern United Arab Emirates and Oman using geospatial technologies in conjunction with SAW, AHP and PFR techniques. Journal of Arid Environment, 157: 77–96.
 El-Behaedi, R., Ghoneim, E.  2018. Flood Risk Assessment of the Abu Simbel Temple Complex (Egypt) based on High-Resolution Spaceborne Stereo Imagery. Journal of Archaeological Science: Reports 20: 458–467.
 Ghoneim, E., Dorofeeva, A., Benedetti, M., Gamble, G., Leonard, L., AbuBakr, M. 2017. Vegetation Drought Analysis in Tunisia: A Geospatial Investigation. Journal of Atmospheric and Earth Sciences 1(1-002), 1–9.
 Robinson, C., El-Kaliouby, H., Ghoneim, E. 2017. Influence of Structures on Drainage Patterns in the Tushka Region, SW Egypt. Journal of African Earth Sciences, 136: 262–271. (Special Issue)
 Aljenaid, S., Ghoneim, E., Abido, M., AlWedhai, K., Khadim, G., Mansoor, S., EL-Deen, W., Abd Hameed, N. 2017. Integrating Remote Sensing and Field Survey to Map Shallow Water Benthic Habitat for the Kingdom of Bahrain. Journal of Environmental Science and Engineering B 6: 176–200.
 Sosnowski, A., Ghoneim, E., Burke, J. J., Hines, E., Halls, J. 2016. Remote regions, remote data: A spatial investigation of precipitation, dynamic land covers, and conflict in the Sudd wetland of South Sudan. Applied Geography, 69: 51–64.
 Rogers, S., Benford, E., Kennedy, A., Austin M., and Ghoneim, E. 2015. Building Damage Analysis following Hurricane Ike on the Bolivar Peninsula, TX. Proc., Coastal structures and solutions to coastal disasters 2015: resilient coastal communities. American Society of Civil Engineers (ASCE), 161–171.
 Ghoneim E., Mashaly, J., Gamble, D., Halls, J., AbuBakr, M. 2015. The use of automated shorelines to assess the response of pre- and post-beach protection and projected shoreline change in the Rosetta Promontory, Nile Delta. Geomorphology, 228, 1–14.
 Ghoneim, E., Foody, G. 2013. Assessing flash flood hazard in an arid mountainous region. Arabian Journal of Geosciences 6 (4): 1191–1202.
 AbuBakr, M., Ghoneim, E., El-Baz, F., Zeneldin, M., Zeid, S. 2013. Use of radar data to unveil the paleolakes and the ancestral course of Wadi El-Arish, Sinai Peninsula, Egypt. Geomorphology, 194, 34–45.
 Abdelkareem, M., Ghoneim, E., El-Baz., F., Askawy, A. 2012. New Insight on Paleoriver Development in the Eastern Sahara. Journal of African Earth Sciences, 62 (1): 35 - 40.
 Abdelkareem, M., El-Baz, F. Askalawy, M., Askawy, A., Ghoneim, E. 2012. Groundwater Prospect map of Egypt's Qena Valley using data fusion. International Journal of Image and Data Fusion 3(2): 169 – 189.
 Ghoneim, E., Benedetti, M., El-Baz, F. 2012. An Integrated Remote Sensing and GIS Analysis of the Kufrah Paleoriver, Eastern Sahara, Libya. Geomorphology, 139: 242 – 257.
 Shaban, A., Hamzé, M., El-Baz, F., Ghoneim, E. 2009. Characterization of oil spill along the Lebanese coast by remote sensing. Environmental Forensics Journal, 10 (1): 51–59.
 Gaber, A., Ghoneim, E., Khalaf, F., El-Baz, F. 2009. Delineation of Paleolakes in Arid Regions Using Remote Sensing and GIS. Journal of Arid Environments, 73: 127–134.
 Ghoneim, E. Ibn-Batutah: 2009. A possible simple impact structure in southeastern Libya. Geomorphology, 103 (3): 340–350. 
 Ghoneim, E. 2009. A Remote Sensing Study of Some Impacts of Global Warming on the Arab Region. In: Tolba, M and Saab, N. (edit), Report on Arab Environment: Climate Change, The Arab Forum for Environment and Development, Chapter 3: 31–46.
 Ghoneim, E. 2008. Optimum groundwater locations in the Northern United Arab Emirates. International Journal of Remote Sensing, 29 (20): 5879–5906.
 Ghoneim, E., El-Baz F. 2008. Mapping water basins in the Eastern Sahara by SRTM data. IEEE 1: 1- 4.
 Ghoneim, E., Robinson, C., El-Baz, F. 2007. Relics of ancient drainage in the eastern Sahara revealed by radar topography data. International Journal of Remote Sensing, 28 (8): 1759–1772.
 El-Baz, F., Ghoneim, E. 2007. Largest crater in the Great Sahara revealed by multi-spectral images and radar data. International Journal of Remote Sensing, 28 (2): 451–458. (2007 Best Letter Award by RSPS).
 Ghoneim, E., El-Baz, F. 2007 The application of radar topographic data to mapping of a mega-paleodrainage in the Eastern Sahara. Journal of Arid Environments, 69: 658–675.
 Ghoneim, E., El-Baz, F. 2007. Dem-optical-radar data integration for paleo- hydrological mapping in the northern Darfur, Sudan: Implication for groundwater exploration. International Journal of Remote Sensing, 28 (22): 5001–5018.
 Shaban, A., Ghoneim, E., Hamzé, M., El-Baz, F. 2007. A post-conflict assessment to characterize the oil spill off-shore Lebanon by using remote sensing. Lebanese Science Journal, 8 (2), 75–85.
 El-Baz, F., Ghoneim, E. 2006. Veiled crater in the eastern Sahara.  The Planetary Report; XXVI (4): 10–15.
 Foody, G., Ghoneim, E. Arnell, N. 2004. Predicting locations sensitive to flash flooding in an arid environment. Journal of Hydrology, 292: 48–58.
 Ghoneim, E., Arnell, N., Foody, G. 2002. Characterizing the flash flood hazards potential along the Red Sea coast of Egypt. The Extremes of the Extremes: Extraordinary Floods. IAHS Publ, 271: 211- 216.

See also
 Timeline of women in science

References

Egyptian women geologists
Egyptian academics
Alumni of the University of Southampton
Living people
Year of birth missing (living people)
Geomorphologists
Academic staff of Tanta University
Egyptian geologists